Garvoc is a town in the Western District of Victoria, Australia.

The town is the proposed location for a regional livestock selling centre servicing the area between Warrnambool and Colac.

Traditional ownership
The formally recognised traditional owners for the area in which Garvoc sits are groups within the Eastern Maar people, who are represented by the Eastern Maar Aboriginal Corporation.

References

External links

Towns in Victoria (Australia)